Thunder Bay is a city in and the seat of Thunder Bay District, Ontario, Canada. It is the most populous municipality in Northwestern Ontario and the second most populous (after Greater Sudbury) municipality in Northern Ontario; its population is 108,843 according to the 2021 Canadian Census. 
Located on Lake Superior, the census metropolitan area of Thunder Bay has a population of 123,258 and consists of the city of Thunder Bay, the municipalities of Oliver Paipoonge and Neebing, the townships of Shuniah, Conmee, O'Connor, and Gillies, and the Fort William First Nation.

European settlement in the region began in the late 17th century with a French fur trading outpost on the banks of the Kaministiquia River. It grew into an important transportation hub with its port forming an important link in the shipping of grain and other products from western Canada, through the Great Lakes and the Saint Lawrence Seaway, to the east coast. Forestry and manufacturing played important roles in the city's economy. They have declined in recent years, but have been replaced by a "knowledge economy" based on medical research and education. Thunder Bay is the site of the Thunder Bay Regional Health Research Institute.

On 1 January 1970, the City of Thunder Bay was formed through the merger of the cities of Fort William, Port Arthur, and the geographic townships of Neebing and McIntyre. The city is often referred to as the "Lakehead", or "Canadian Lakehead", because of its location at the end of Great Lakes navigation on the Canadian side of the border.

History

Before 1900
Various Anishinaabe peoples such as the Ojibwa are indigenous to the Thunder Bay Area. European settlement at Thunder Bay began with two French fur trading posts (in 1683 and 1717) which were subsequently abandoned (see Fort William, Ontario). In 1803, the Montreal-based North West Company established Fort William as its mid-continent entrepôt. The fort thrived until 1821 when the North West Company merged with the Hudson's Bay Company, and Fort William was no longer needed.

By the 1850s, the Province of Canada began to take an interest in its western extremity. Discovery of copper in the Keweenaw Peninsula of Michigan had prompted a national demand for mining locations on the Canadian shores of Lake Superior. The Province of Canada negotiated the Robinson Treaty in 1850 with the Ojibwa of Lake Superior. As a result, an Indian reserve was set aside for them south of the Kaministiquia River. In 1859–60, the Department of Crown Lands surveyed two townships (Neebing and Paipoonge) and the Town Plot of Fort William for European-Canadian settlement.

Another settlement developed a few miles to the north of Fort William after construction by the federal Department of Public Works of a road connecting Lake Superior with the Red River Colony. The work was directed by Simon James Dawson (see Port Arthur, Ontario). This public works depot or construction headquarters acquired its first name in May 1870 when Colonel Garnet Wolseley named it Prince Arthur's Landing. It was renamed Port Arthur by the Canadian Pacific Railway (CPR) in May 1883.

The arrival of the CPR in 1875 sparked a long rivalry between the towns, which did not end until their amalgamation in 1970. Until the 1880s, Port Arthur was a much larger community. The CPR, in collaboration with the Hudson's Bay Company, preferred east Fort William, located on the lower Kaministiquia River where the fur trade posts were. Provoked by a prolonged tax dispute with Port Arthur and its seizure of a locomotive in 1889, the CPR relocated all its employees and facilities to Fort William. The collapse of silver mining after 1890 undermined the economy of Port Arthur. It had an economic depression, while Fort William thrived.

20th century

In the era of Sir Wilfrid Laurier, Thunder Bay began a period of extraordinary growth, based on improved access to markets via the transcontinental railway and development of the western wheat boom. The CPR double-tracked its Winnipeg–Thunder Bay line. The Canadian Northern Railway established facilities at Port Arthur. The Grand Trunk Pacific Railway began construction of its facilities at the Fort William Mission in 1905, and the federal government began construction of the National Transcontinental Railway. Grain elevator construction boomed as the volume of grain shipped to Europe increased. Both cities incurred debt to grant bonuses to manufacturing industries.

Thunder Bay was the first city in the world to enact daylight saving time, on 1 July 1908.

By 1914, the twin cities had modern infrastructures (sewers, potable water supply, street lighting, electric light, etc.) Both Fort William and Port Arthur were proponents of municipal ownership. As early as 1892, Port Arthur built Canada's first municipally-owned electric street railway. Both cities spurned Bell Telephone Company of Canada to establish their own municipally-owned telephone systems in 1902.

The boom came to an end in 1913–1914, aggravated by the outbreak of the First World War. A war-time economy emerged with the making of munitions and shipbuilding. Men from the cities joined the 52nd, 94th, and 141st Battalions of the Canadian Expeditionary Force.

Railway employment was hurt when the federal government took over the National Transcontinental Railway and Lake Superior Division from the Grand Trunk in 1915, and the Canadian Northern Railway in 1918. These were amalgamated with other government-owned railways in 1923 to form the Canadian National Railways. The CNR closed many of the Canadian Northern Railway facilities in Port Arthur. It opened the Neebing yards in Neebing Township in 1922. By 1929, the population of the two cities had recovered to pre-war levels.

The forest products industry has played an important role in the Thunder Bay economy from the 1870s. In the 1880s, Herman Finger established the Pigeon River Lumber Company in the area, and also built the Gunflint and Lake Superior Railroad, but he dissolved the lumber company and moved his operations to The Pas by 1919. Logs and lumber were shipped primarily to the United States. In 1917, the first pulp and paper mill was established in Port Arthur. It was followed by a mill at Fort William, in 1920. Eventually, there were four mills operating.

Manufacturing resumed in 1937 when the Canada Car and Foundry Company plant (opened for the manufacture of naval ships and railcars during the late World War I) re-opened to build British aircraft. Now run by Alstom, the plant has remained a mainstay of the post-war economy. It has produced forestry equipment and transportation equipment for urban transit systems, such as the Toronto Transit Commission and GO Transit.

Amalgamation
On 1 January 1970, the City of Thunder Bay was formed through the merger of the cities of Fort William, Port Arthur, and the geographic townships of Neebing and McIntyre. Its name was the result of a referendum held previously on 23 June 1969, to determine the new name of the amalgamated Fort William and Port Arthur. Officials debated over the names to be put on the ballot, taking suggestions from residents including "Lakehead" and "The Lakehead". Because the vote split between the two similar names, "Thunder Bay" prevailed with a narrow plurality. The final tally was "Thunder Bay" with 15,870, "Lakehead" with 15,302, and "The Lakehead" with 8,377.

There was more controversy over the selection of a name for the amalgamated city than over whether to amalgamate. A vocal minority of the population preferred "The Lakehead". There was much discussion about other cities in the world that use a definite article in their names. The area was often referred to as "The Lakehead" before and after amalgamation based on its geographic location. It was seen as the "head" of shipping on the Great Lakes and the "rail head".

The expansion of highways, beginning with the Trans-Canada Highway and culminating with the opening of Highway 17 (linking Sault Ste Marie to Thunder Bay in 1960), has significantly diminished railway and shipping activity since the 1970s and 80s. Shipping on the Saint Lawrence Seaway was superseded by trucking on highways. Grain shipping on the Great Lakes to the East has declined substantially in favour of transport to Pacific Coast ports. As a result, many grain elevators have been closed and demolished. The Kaministiquia River was abandoned by industry and shipping.

Today
Thunder Bay has become the regional services centre for Northwestern Ontario with most provincial departments represented. Lakehead University, established through the lobbying of local businesspeople and professionals, has proven to be a major asset. Another upper level institution is Confederation College.

Geography

The city reflects the settlement patterns of the 19th century and sprawls. Anchoring the west end of the city, the Fort William Town Plot, surveyed in 1859–60, was named West Fort William (or Westfort) in 1888 by the CPR. The land adjoining the lower Kaministiquia River became the residential and central business district of the town and city of Fort William. A large uninhabited area adjoining the Neebing and McIntyre rivers, which became known as Intercity, separated Fort William from the residential and central business district of Port Arthur. At the extreme east of the city, a part of McIntyre Township was annexed to the town of Port Arthur in 1892, forming what later became known as the Current River area.

The former Port Arthur section is more typical of the Canadian Shield, with gently sloping hills and very thin soil lying on top of bedrock with many bare outcrops. The former Fort William section occupies flat alluvial land along the Kaministiquia River. In the river delta are two large islands: Mission Island and McKellar Island. Since 1970, the central business districts of Fort William and Port Arthur have suffered a serious decline. Business and government relocated to new developments in the Intercity area. There has also been substantial residential growth in adjacent areas of the former Neebing and McIntyre townships.

Neighbourhoods

Thunder Bay is composed of two formerly separate cities: Port Arthur and Fort William. Both still retain much of their distinct civic identities, reinforced by the buffering effect of the Intercity area between them. Port Arthur and Fort William each have their own central business districts and suburban areas. Some of the more well-known neighbourhoods include the Bay and Algoma area, which has a large northern European population centred around the Finnish Labour Temple and the Italian Cultural Centre; Simpson-Ogden and the East End, two of the oldest neighbourhoods in Fort William located north of Downtown Fort William; Intercity, a large business district located between Fort William and Port Arthur; Current River, the northernmost neighbourhood of Port Arthur; and Westfort, the oldest settlement in Thunder Bay. Within city limits are some small rural communities, such as Vickers Heights and North McIntyre, which were located in the former townships of Neebing and McIntyre, respectively.

Climate

The Thunder Bay area experiences a warm-summer humid continental climate (Köppen: Dfb) and a continental subarctic (Dfc) influence in northeastern areas of the city (including that affected by Lake Superior), but not necessarily falling in this zone. This results in cooler summer temperatures and warmer winter temperatures for an area extending inland as far as 16 km. As a result, it holds Ontario's record for coldest day with wind chill.
Relatively recently, however, all-time records for both the latest first freeze and the longest growing season were set on October 17, 2021; the previous record of October 8, 2016 was beaten by 9 days, and the previous record for the longest growing season of 139 days (also set in 2016) was beaten by a day.

The city is quite sunny, with an average of 2,121 hours of bright sunshine each year, ranging from 268.1 hours in July to 86.2 hours in November. Winters are comparatively dry with the snowfall being very limited and temperatures much colder than in Houghton, Michigan, on the U.S. side of the lake, where the climate is marked by heavy lake-effect snow. Thunder Bay has more of a continental climate in comparison.

Demographics

According to the 2016 Census, 48.8% of Thunder Bay's residents were male and 51.2% were female. Residents 19 years of age or younger accounted for approximately 19.9% of the population. People aged by 20 and 39 years accounted for 25.0%, while those between 40 and 64 made up 35.1% of the population. The average age of a Thunder Bayer in May 2016 was 43.3, compared to the average of 41.0 for Canada as a whole.

A further 13,712 people lived in Thunder Bay's Census Metropolitan Area, which apart from Thunder Bay includes the municipalities of Neebing and Oliver Paipoonge, the townships of Conmee, Gillies, O'Connor and Shuniah, and the aboriginal community of Fort William First Nation.

Ethnicity 
According to the census, Thunder Bay was home to 13,565 people of Finnish descent, the highest concentration of people of Finnish origin in Canada. Thunder Bay has a large Indigenous population representing 14.1% of the population, while visible minorities represent 7.5% of the population.

Note: Totals greater than 100% due to multiple origin responses.

Language 
Mother-tongue language (2016)

Religion
In the 2021 Census 56.0% of Thunder Bay residents belonged to a Christian denomination, down from 72.0% in 2011: 30.4% of the total population affiliated with the Roman Catholic Church, 17.6% were Protestant, 4.9% were Christians of unspecified denomination and 3.2% followed other Christian denominations, largely Eastern Orthodox. People of no religion were 39.9% of the population, up from 26.2% in 2011. Of non-Christian religions, the largest were Hinduism, (1.1%) and Islam (0.9%). 0.6% of residents adhered to Traditional (North American Indigenous) spirituality. All other religions and/or spiritual beliefs made up 1.4% of the population.

Crime
From 2012 to 2014, and again from 2016 to 2019, Thunder Bay had the highest per-capita rate of homicide among Canadian cities. Winnipeg had previously held this distinction between 2007 and 2011. In 2014, the per-capita rate of homicides in Thunder Bay was more than double the 2012 rate, and was over 2.5 times higher than the city with the next highest rate. However, between 2014 and 2015, the crime rate decreased by 6%. This was the second highest decrease in any major Canadian city, behind only Moncton, New Brunswick.

Economy

As the largest city in Northwestern Ontario, Thunder Bay is the region's commercial, administrative and medical centre. Many of the city's largest single employers are in the public sector. The City of Thunder Bay, the Thunder Bay Regional Health Sciences Centre, the Lakehead District School Board and the Government of Ontario each employ over 1,500 people. Resolute Forest Products is the largest private employer, employing over 1,500 people.

Bombardier Transportation operates a  plant in Thunder Bay which manufactures mass transit vehicles and equipment, employing approximately 800 people. The plant was built by Canadian Car and Foundry to build railway box cars in 1912, began building passenger railcar and transit cars from 1963 onwards Bombardier acquired the facility from UTDC in 1992, which had acquired it from Cancar in 1984.

Lack of innovation by traditional industries, such as forest products, combined with high labour costs have reduced the industrial base of Thunder Bay by close to 60%. The grain trade has declined because of the loss of grain transportation subsidies and the loss of European markets. The gradual transition from shipping by train and boat to shipping by truck, and the Canada–United States Free Trade Agreement have ended Thunder Bay's privileged position as a linchpin in Canadian east–west freight-handling trade. As a result, the city has lost its traditional raison d'être as a break-bulk point. However, in recent years shipments through the port of Thunder Bay have stabilized, and it remains an important part of the Saint Lawrence Seaway.

In an effort to rejuvenate its economy, the city has been actively working to attract quaternary or "knowledge-based" industries, primarily in the fields of molecular medicine and genomics. The city is home to the western campus of the Northern Ontario School of Medicine, the first medical school to open in Canada in a generation. The city also has a law school.

Government and politics

The city is governed by a mayor and twelve councillors. The mayor and five of the councillors are elected at large by the whole city. Seven councillors are elected for the seven wards: Current River Ward, McIntyre Ward, McKellar Ward, Neebing Ward, Northwood Ward, Red River Ward, and Westfort Ward.

Thunder Bay is represented in the Canadian Parliament by Marcus Powlowski, and Patty Hajdu, both members of the Liberal Party of Canada, and in the Ontario Legislature by Lise Vaugeois of the Ontario New Democratic Party and Kevin Holland of the Ontario Progressive Conservative Party.

City symbols
Sleeping Giant
A large formation of mesas on the Sibley Peninsula in Lake Superior which resembles a reclining giant has become a symbol of the city. Sibley peninsula partially encloses the waters of Thunder Bay, and dominates the view of the lake from the northern section of the city (formerly Port Arthur). The Sleeping Giant also figures on the city's coat of arms and the city flag.

Coat of arms

The coat of arms of Thunder Bay, Ontario, is a combination of the coats of arms of both Port Arthur and Fort William, with a unifying symbol—the Sleeping Giant—at the base of the arms.

Corporate logo
The city logo depicts a stylized thunderbird, called Animikii, a statue of which is located at the city's Kaministiquia River Heritage Park. The slogan, Superior by Nature, is a double play on words reflecting the city's natural setting on Lake Superior.

City flag
Thunder Bay's flag was created in 1972, when mayor Saul Laskin wanted to promote the city by having a distinctive flag. The city held a contest, which Cliff Redden won. The flag has a 1:2 ratio and depicts a golden sky from the rising sun behind the Sleeping Giant, which sits in the blue waters of Lake Superior. The sun is represented by a red maple leaf, a symbol of Canada. Green and gold are Thunder Bay's city colours.

Culture

The city of Thunder Bay was declared a "Cultural Capital of Canada" in 2003. Throughout the city are cultural centres representing the diverse population, such as the Finnish Labour Temple, Scandinavia House, the Italian Cultural Centre, the Polish Legion, and a wide variety of others.

The shag, a combination shower and stag held to celebrate the engagement of a couple, and the Persian, a cinnamon bun pastry with pink icing, both originated in the city.

Thunder Bay is served by the Thunder Bay Public Library, which has four branches.

Events in the city include Thunder Pride, an LGBTQ pride parade held since 2010, and the annual Canadian Lakehead Exhibition.

Arts

Thunder Bay is home to a variety of music and performance arts venues. The Thunder Bay Symphony Orchestra, founded in 1960, is the only professional orchestra between Winnipeg and Toronto and has 31 full-time and up to 30 extra musicians presenting a full range of classical music. New Music North is vital to the contemporary classical music scene in the city by offering novel contemporary chamber music concerts. The largest professional theatre is Magnus Theatre. Founded in 1971, it offers six stage plays each season and is located in the renovated Port Arthur Public School on Red River Road. The Thunder Bay Community Auditorium, which seats 1500, is the primary venue for various types of entertainment.

The Vox Popular Media Arts Festival, established in 2005, is an independent film festival that features local, national, and international films with the theme of "Films for the People." The festival is held in early October at 314 Bay Street in the historic Finnish Labour Temple. Thunder Bay is also home to the North of Superior Film Association (NOSFA). Established in 1992, the NOSFA features monthly screenings of international and Canadian films at the Cumberland Cinema Centre, and organized the annual Northwest Film Fest film festival that attracts several thousand patrons. Two of Thunder Bay's festivals were included in the 2018 list of the 100 best festival compiled by Festivals and Events Ontario: Teddy Bears Picnic and Live on the Waterfront, the former also being recognized as best promotional campaign and sponsor of the year.

The Northwestern Ontario Writers Workshop (NOWW), founded in 1997, is the largest of several writing groups based in Thunder Bay. Its mission is "to encourage and promote the development of the writers and literature of Northwestern Ontario". NOWW does this through a number of activities including regular workshops, monthly readings (summer excepted), an eWriter in Residence program, and other events designed to help and inspire writers in the region. NOWW also hosts an annual LitFest in May which includes an awards presentation to the winners of its international annual writing contest. Past contest judges include a Who's Who of Canadian writers such as Heather O'Neill, Michael Christie, Jane Urquhart, and Liz Howard.

Museums and galleries
The Thunder Bay Art Gallery, which was founded in 1976, specializes in the works of First Nations artists, having a collection of national significance. The Thunder Bay Historical Museum Society, founded in 1908, presents local and travelling exhibitions and houses an impressive collection of artifacts, photographs, paintings, documents and maps in its archives. The City of Thunder bay also houses the Northwestern Ontario Sports Hall of Fame, and the Thunder Bay Military Museum (housed within the O'Kelley Armoury on Park Street).

Thunder Bay has two recognized Federal Heritage buildings on the Register of the Government of Canada Heritage Buildings:
 Ordnance Store (recognized 1997)
 Park Street Armoury (recognized 1994)
Both are part of HMCS Griffin.

Places of worship

Thunder Bay has many places of worship supported by people of a variety of faiths, reflecting the cultural diversity of the population. A sample:

 Assumption of the Blessed Virgin Mary Church – Ukrainian Orthodox. The original wooden church, built by Ukrainian Orthodox families in 1911/1912, was almost destroyed by fire in 1936. The current church was built on the same site and opened in 1937. It has decorative gold domes that are characteristic of Ukrainian churches of the Bukovina area, with Orthodox crosses atop the domes.
 Calvary Lutheran Church was established in 1958 as a mission congregation of the Minnesota North District (USA).
 The Church of Jesus Christ of Latter-day Saints (LDS Church). The church has a family history library open to anyone to research their genealogy.
 Elim Community Christian Centre. Pentecostal Church located in Current River area of the city which is now named Refreshing Waters Community Church.
 Evangel Church. Contemporary Pentecostal church with a strong emphasis on children, youth and (with their convenient location next to Lakehead University) young adults.
 First-Wesley United Church.  The current Wesley United Church was preceded by a much smaller structure, Grace Methodist Church, which was built in 1891 and had a capacity of 100 people. The current Gothic 1,025 seat sanctuary was constructed in 1910.
 Hilldale Lutheran Church. Offers services in both English and Finnish. The church has an intimate atmosphere and wonderful acoustics, and is frequently used for musical performances.
 Holy Trinity Greek Orthodox Church. Founded in 1918, the church moved to its present building in 1991. The church is active in providing non-profit housing for needy families.
 Hope Christian Reformed Church. Services are recorded so that anyone with an internet connection may listen.
 Kitchitwa Kateri Anamewgamik. Roman Catholic communal church geared to Native culture and teachings. A drop-in centre provides coffee and serves soup & bannock.
 Lakehead Unitarian Fellowship. This Unitarian Universalist community includes Christians, Buddhists, Pagans, Theists, non-theists, Humanist-agnostics, and Atheists. They welcome and celebrate the presence and participation of gay, lesbian, bisexual and transgender persons.
 Redwood Park Church Contemporary member of the Christian Missionary Alliance.  Runs an outreach at the old building on Edward street with a food bank and a clothing store.
 Saalem Church. Pentecostal church with services in both English and Finnish.
 Shaarey Shomayim Congregation – Jewish Synagogue. This egalitarian community has the only mikvah between Winnipeg and Toronto.
 Shepherd of Israel Congregation – Messianic Jewish. Affiliated with Evangelical movement.
 St. Agnes Church. Roman Catholic Church. Founded in 1885, the new St. Agnes Church and Hall was dedicated on 6 June 1982. St. Vincent de Paul Society operates a food bank out of this church.
 St Stephen the Martyr Anglican Church. Provides a food cupboard for the Current River area.
 St. John the Evangelist Anglican Church. Founded in 1872, the current building was erected in 1884.
 St. Patrick's Cathedral – Roman Catholic. The old St. Patrick's Church was built in 1893. In 1963 it was replaced by the current cathedral on the same site.
 St Paul's Anglican Church. Historic, stately parish built in the English Gothic style.
 St. Anthony's Parish - Roman Catholic. Located in The John-Jumbo area of Port Arthur.
 Thunder Bay Masjid - Muslim Mosque
 Vedic Cultural Centre (ISKON) Thunder Bay - Hindu Temple

Visitor attractions
Thunder Bay's main tourist attraction is Fort William Historical Park, a reconstruction of the North West Company's Fort William fur trade post as it was in 1815, which attracts 100,000 visitors annually. The marina in downtown Port Arthur, an area known as The Waterfront District, draws visitors for its panoramic view of the Sleeping Giant and the presence of various water craft. The marina, known as Prince Arthur's landing also includes recreational trails along the lake, playground, harbour cruises, helicopter tours, the Alexander Henry (a retired Canadian Coast Guard icebreaker), splash pad (summer), skating rink (winter), and art gallery, gift shop, numerous restaurants, and a newly opened Delta Hotel and conference centre. There are several small surface amethyst mines in the area, some of which allow visitors to search for their own crystals. A 2.74 m (9 ft) statue of Terry Fox is situated at the Terry Fox Memorial and Lookout on the outskirts of the city near the place where he was forced to abandon his run. Other tourists attractions are listed below:

 Bluffs Scenic Lookout
 Boulevard Lake Park
 Canada Games Complex
 Canadian Lakehead Exhibition
 Cascades Conservation Area
 Centennial Conservatory
 Centennial Park
 Chapples Park
 Chippewa Park
 Connaught Square
 Finnish Labour Temple
 Fort William Gardens
 Fort William Stadium
 Hillcrest Park
 The Hoito
 Intercity Shopping Centre
 Kakabeka Falls
 Magnus Theatre
 Mission Island Marsh
 Mount McKay Lookout
 
 Northwestern Ontario Sports Hall of Fame
 Ouimet Canyon
 Prince Arthur's Landing waterfront district
 Port Arthur Stadium
 Silver Falls
 Thunder Bay Art Gallery
 Thunder Bay Community Auditorium
 Thunder Bay Historical Museum
 Thunder Bay Marina
 International Friendship Gardens
 Trowbridge Falls
 Waverley Park

Sports and recreation
Thunder Bay's proximity to the wilderness of the Taiga and the rolling hills and mountains of the Canadian Shield allow its residents to enjoy very active lifestyles. The city has hosted several large sporting events including the Summer Canada Games in 1981, the Nordic World Ski Championships in 1995, the Continental Cup of Curling in 2003, and the U-18 Baseball World Cup in 2010 & 2017. Thunder Bay is the host for the 2024 Women's Baseball World Cup.

Recreational facilities
Thunder Bay enjoys many recreational facilities. The city operates fifteen neighbourhood community centres, which offer various sporting and fitness facilities as well as seasonal activities such as dances. The city also operates six indoor ice rinks and 84 seasonal outdoor rinks, two indoor community pools and three seasonal outdoor pools as well as a portable pool and two maintained public beaches, several curling sheets, and three golf courses, among others. Listed below are some of the city's major facilities.

Multi-use facilities

The Canada Games Complex
The Fort William Gardens
Port Arthur Stadium
Royal Canadian Legion Sports Complex

Municipal ice rinks and indoor pools

Current River Arena
Delaney Arena
Grandview Arena
Neebing Arena
Port Arthur Arena
Thunder Bay Tournament Centre (2 ice surfaces)
Sir Winston Churchill Community Pool
Volunteer Community Pool

Golf courses

Centennial Golf Course (9 holes)
Chapples Memorial Golf Course (18 holes) (municipal)
Dragon Hills Golf Course (9 holes)
Emerald Greens Golf Course (9 holes)
Fort William Country Club (18 holes)
Municipal Golf Course (9 holes) (municipal) (closed)
Northern Lights Golf Complex (9 holes par 3/9 holes regulation)
Strathcona Golf Course (18 holes) (municipal)
Thunder Bay Country Club (9 holes)
Whitewater Golf Club (18 holes)

Ski hills

Loch Lomond Ski Resort
Mount Baldy Ski Resort

Cross-country skiing facilities

Lappe Nordic Ski Centre
Kamview Nordic Centre

Sports teams

Thunder Bay is also home to the National Development Centre – Thunder Bay, an elite cross-country ski team that attracts many of Canada's best Junior and U-23 skiers.

Sport events
 Thunder Bay 10 mile road race
 2010 World Junior Baseball Championship
 2017 U-18 Baseball World Cup
 2024 Women's Baseball World Cup

Infrastructure

Transport

Thunder Bay receives air, rail and shipping traffic due to its prime location along major continental transport routes. The municipally owned Thunder Bay Transit operates 17 routes across the city's urban area. The city is served by the Thunder Bay International Airport, the fourth busiest airport in Ontario by aircraft movements. The main highway through the city is Highway 11/17, a four-lane highway designated as the Thunder Bay Expressway.

The city is an important railway hub, served by both the Canadian National and Canadian Pacific Railway. Passenger rail service to Thunder Bay ended on 15 January 1990, when Via Rail rerouted the Canadian to the north.

Harbour

Thunder Bay has been a port since the days of the North West Company, which maintained a schooner on Lake Superior. The Port of Thunder Bay is the largest outbound port on the St. Lawrence Seaway System, and the sixth-largest port in Canada. The Thunder Bay Port Authority manages Keefer Terminal, built on a 320,000 square metre site on Lake Superior.

Medical centres and hospitals
Thunder Bay has one major hospital, the Thunder Bay Regional Health Sciences Centre. Other health care services include the St. Joseph's Care Group, which operates long-term care centres such as the Lakehead Psychiatric Hospital, St. Joseph's Hospital, and Hogarth Riverview Manor. The Northern Ontario School of Medicine has a campus at Lakehead University. The city is also home to a variety of smaller medical and dental clinics.

Education

Thunder Bay has 38 elementary schools, three middle schools, eight secondary schools, two private schools, and an adult education facility. The city also has several other private for-profit colleges and tutoring programmes. Post-secondary institutions in Thunder Bay include Confederation College and Lakehead University.

The Lakehead District School Board is the largest school board in the city, with 22 elementary schools, 3 high schools and a centre for adult studies. The Thunder Bay Catholic District School Board is the second largest, with 16 elementary schools, three middle schools and two high schools. Conseil scolaire de district catholique des Aurores boréales operates one elementary and one high school in Thunder Bay, and an additional six schools throughout the Thunder Bay District.

Media

Print
Thunder Bay has one daily newspaper, The Chronicle-Journal, which has a circulation of approximately 28,000 and has coverage of all of Northwestern Ontario. The Chronicle Journal publishes a free weekly called Spot every Thursday, focusing on entertainment. There are two weekly newspapers: Thunder Bay's Source, a weekly newspaper operated by Dougall Media, and Canadan Sanomat, a Finnish-language weekly newspaper. Lakehead University has a student newspaper called The Argus, which is published weekly during the school year. The city publishes a bi-monthly newsletter to citizens titled yourCity, which is also available online in a PDF format, by electronic subscription and RSS feed.

Television
Three English-language stations supply Thunder Bay with free digital over-the-air television. Programming from the Global and CTV networks is provided by a locally owned twinstick operation branded as Thunder Bay Television, and the city receives TVOntario on channel 9. CBC Television and Ici Radio-Canada Télé are available only on cable and satellite in the area.

The cable provider in Thunder Bay is Shaw; although locally owned TBayTel has been granted a licence by the Canadian Radio-television and Telecommunications Commission (CRTC) to compete in the cable TV market. The community channel on Shaw Cable is branded as Shaw TV, and airs on cable channel 10.

WBKP TV channel 5, the CW affiliate in Calumet, Michigan, can be received in Thunder Bay with an outdoor roof antenna and a digital-capable television or receiver.

Radio
Thunder Bay is home to 12 radio stations, all of which broadcast on the FM band.

There are four commercial radio stations based in the city – CJSD-FM and CKPR-FM, owned by Dougall Media, the parent company of Thunder Bay Television and Thunder Bay's Source, and CJUK-FM and CKTG-FM, owned by Acadia Broadcasting. One additional station, CFQK-FM, targets the Thunder Bay market from transmitters in Kaministiquia and Shuniah. The city receives CBC Radio One as CBQT-FM and CBC Radio 2 as CBQ-FM, at 88.3 FM and 101.7 FM respectively. The French Première Chaîne is available as a repeater of Sudbury-based CBON-FM on 89.3 FM. Lakehead University operates a campus radio station, CILU-FM, at 102.7 FM, and CJOA-FM 95.1 broadcasts Christian-oriented programming and is run by a local non-profit group. Thunder Bay Information Radio CKSI-FM is broadcast 24/7 on 90.5 and is also the city's emergency radio station.

Notable people

Sister cities
Thunder Bay has five sister cities on three continents, which are selected based on economic, cultural and political criteria.

  Seinäjoki, Finland, since 1974
  Little Canada, Minnesota, United States, since 1977
  Duluth, Minnesota, United States, since 1980
  Gifu, Japan, since 2007
  Jiaozuo, China, since 2017
  Siderno, Italy

See also

Synergy North

Notes and references
Thorold J. Tronrud and A. Ernest Epp (1995) Thunder Bay: From Rivalry to Unity, Thunder Bay Historical Museum Society,

Notes

External links

 
1679 establishments in the French colonial empire
Cities in Ontario
Populated places established in 1679
Populated places on Lake Superior in Canada
Port settlements in Ontario
Single-tier municipalities in Ontario
Ski areas and resorts in Canada